Flutter may refer to:

Technology
 Aeroelastic flutter, a rapid self-feeding motion, potentially destructive, that is excited by aerodynamic forces in aircraft and bridges
 Flutter (American company), a gesture recognition technology company acquired by Google in 2013
 Flutter (electronics and communication), any rapid variation of signal parameters
 Flutter (software), an open source UI framework and SDK for building multi-platform apps

Medicine
 "Heart flutter", an abnormally rapid heartbeat:
 Atrial flutter, a common abnormal heart rhythm
 Ventricular flutter, a tachycardia affecting the ventricles with a rate over 250-350 beats/min
 Flutter valve, a one-way valve used in respiratory medicine to prevent air from travelling back along a chest tube

Arts and entertainment
 Flutter (comics), a comic series

Music
 Flutter-tonguing, a technique for playing wind instruments
 Flutter, a 2001 album and a composition by Otomo Yoshihide's New Jazz Quintet
 "Flutter", a song by Bonobo from his 2003 album Dial 'M' for Monkey
 "Flutter", a song by Autechre from the 1994 EP Anti EP

Film
 Flutter (2006 film), 2006 animated short by Howie Shia
 Flutter (2011 film), 2011 film directed by Giles Borg

Other uses
 Fluttershy, a My Little Pony character
 Flutter Entertainment, an Irish-headquartered betting company 
 Flutter, a colloquial term for a small bet or wager in gambling
 Flutter kick, a movement used in swimming or callisthenics

See also
 Controlled aerodynamic instability phenomena
 Wow and flutter measurement
 Wow and flutter (disambiguation)